Die rote Zora und ihre Bande is a German television series, based on the 1941 children's novel The Outsiders of Uskoken Castle by Kurt Held.

See also
List of German television series

External links
 

German children's television series
Television shows based on German novels
Television shows based on children's books
Television series set in the 1930s
Television shows set in Croatia
1979 German television series debuts
1979 German television series endings
German-language television shows
Das Erste original programming
Films directed by Fritz Umgelter